Stade Émile Mayrisch is a football and athletics stadium, in Esch-sur-Alzette, in south-western Luxembourg. The stadium has a capacity of 7,826. It is named after Luxembourgian industrialist and steel industry trail-blazer Émile Mayrisch. It is currently the home stadium of the football club CS Fola Esch and the athletics club CA Fola Esch.

References

External links
World Stadiums - Luxembourg
StadiumDB page

Football venues in Luxembourg
Athletics (track and field) venues in Luxembourg
Sports venues in Esch-sur-Alzette